Kou Nai-han (born 12 March 1982) is a Taiwanese volleyball player who has played in 14 matches for the Chinese Taipei women's national volleyball team. She was part of the Chinese Taipei women's national volleyball team at the 2006 FIVB Volleyball Women's World Championship in Japan.

Playing history 
 National Taiwan Normal University
 Taipei Physical Education College

Honours 
 World University Games
 Winner: 2005
 Runner-up: 2003

References 

1982 births
Living people
Taiwanese women's volleyball players
Asian Games bronze medalists for Chinese Taipei
Asian Games medalists in volleyball
Medalists at the 2006 Asian Games
Volleyball players at the 2002 Asian Games
Volleyball players at the 2006 Asian Games
Beach volleyball players at the 2010 Asian Games
Beach volleyball players at the 2018 Asian Games